The futsal tournament at the 2005 Women's Islamic Games was held from 23–27 September 2005 in Tehran, Iran. The Iran women's national futsal team were the winners of the tournament.

See also
Women's Futsal Islamic Games

References

Futsal at the Women's Islamic Games
2005
Women's
Women's futsal competitions